The Krishna Janmasthan Temple Complex is a group of Hindu temples in Mallapura, Mathura, Uttar Pradesh, India. These temples are built at the location where the Hindu deity Krishna is believed to be born, and is adjacent to the Shahi Eidgah mosque built by Aurangzeb.

The place has held religious significance since the 6th century BC. The temples were destroyed multiple times throughout history, most recently by the Mughal emperor Aurangzeb in 1670. He built the Eidgah mosque there which still stands. In 20th century, the new temple complex adjacent the mosque was built with the financial help from industrialists containing the Keshavdeva temple, the Garbha Griha temple at the birthplace and the Bhagavata Bhavan.

History

Ancient and Classical Period 

According to Hindu traditions, Krishna was born to Devaki and Vasudeva in a prison cell where they were confined by his maternal uncle Kansa, a king of Mathura, due to prophecy of his death by the child of Devaki. According to tradition, a temple dedicated to Krishna was built the birthplace by his great grandson Vajranabh. The present site known as Krishna Janmasthan was known as Katra Keshavdeva. The archaeological excavations of the site had revealed pottery and terracotta from 6th century BC. It also produced some Jain sculptures as well as a large Buddhist complex including Yasha Vihara, a monastery, belonging to Gupta period.  The Vaishnava temple may have erected on the place as early as the first century. Some late 8th century inscriptions mentions donations to the site by the Rashtrakutas.

Medieval Period 
In 1017 or 1018, Mahmud of Ghazni attacked and plundered Mahaban. Ghazni's scribe, though not accompanying him on the expedition, Al Utbi describes in his Tarikh-i-Yamini neighbouring holy town which is identified as Mathura. He wrote, "In the centre of the city there was a huge and magnificent temple, which the people believed wasn’t built by men but by the angels... Any description of the temple, either in words or in pictures, would fall short and fail to convey its beauty." Mahmud of Ghazni wrote, "if any one wished to construct a building equal to it, he would not be able to do so without spending a hundred million dinars, and the work would occupy two hundred years, even though the most able and experienced workmen were employed." He ordered to burn all the temples and demolish them. He plundered gold and silver idols and carried away a load of hundred camels. A stone inscription in Sanskrit found from the site mentions that in Vikram Samvat 1207 (1150) a person named Jajja who may have been a vassal of Gahadavala king built a Vishnu temple which was 'brilliantly white and touching the clouds'.

Mughal Period 

Vaishnava saints Chaitanya Mahaprabhu and Vallabhacharya visited Mathura in early 16th century. Abdullah, in the reign of Mughal emperor Jehangir, mentions in Tarikh-i-Daudi the destruction of Mathura and its temples by Delhi Sultan Sikandar Lodi in 16th century. Lodi had prohibited Hindus from bathing in the river and shaving of heads on the banks as well. In the reign of Jehangir, in 1618, Raja Veer Singh Deva Bundela of Orchha had built a temple at the cost of thirty-three lakhs. A French traveller Tavernier visited Mathura in 1650 and had described the octagonal temple built in red sand stone. Italian traveller Niccolao Manucci who worked in Mughal court has also described the temple. Mughal prince Dara Shikoh had patronised the temple and donated a railing to the temple. The railing was removed by Mathura governor Abdun Nabi Khan on the order of Mughal emperor Aurangzeb and he built the Jama mosque on the ruins of the Hindu temples. During the Jat rebellion in Mathura, Abdul Nabi Khan was killed in 1669. Aurangzeb attacked Mathura and destroyed that Keshavdeva temple in 1670 and built the Shahi Eidgah in its place.

Modern Period 
Mathura came under British control in 1804. The East India Company  auctioned the land of Katra and it was purchased by Raja Patnimal, a wealthy banker of Banaras. Raja Patnimal wanted to build the temple but could not do so. His descendants inherited the land of Katra. His descendant Rai Krishna Das was challenged, for the ownership of 13.37 acres of land on which the shrine and the Shahi Eidgah is situated, in two civil suits by the Muslims of Mathura but the Allahabad High Court ruled in favour of Raj Krishna Das in both suits in 1935. Kailash Nath Katju and Madanmohan Chaturvedi had helped in these lawsuits. Politician and educationist Madan Mohan Malaviya acquired the land from Raj Krishna Das on 7 February 1944 at the cost of Rs. 13000 with financial help of Industrialist Jugal Kishore Birla. Following death of Malaviya, Jugal Kishore Birla formed a trust named Shri Krishna Janmabhoomi Trust, later registered as the Shri Krishna Janmasthan Seva Sansthan, on 21 February 1951 and acquired the land. Jugal Kishore Birla entrusted the construction of the new temple with another industrialist and philanthropist Jaidayal Dalmia. The construction of the temple complex was started in October 1953 with leveling of lands and completed in February 1982. His eldest son Vishnu Hari Dalmia succeeded him and served on the Trust until his death. His grandson Anurag Dalmia is Joint Managing Trustee on the Trust. The construction was funded by other business families including Ramnath Goenka.

In 1968, the Shree Krishna Janmasthan Seva Sangh and the Shahi Eidgah committee reached a compromise agreement which granted the temple land to the Trust and the management of the Shahi Eidgah to the Eidgah committee as well no legal claim of the Shree Krishna Janmasthan Seva Sangh on the Shahi Eidgah. Indian National Congress leader Ganesh Vasudev Mavalankar was the first chairman of the Shree Krishna Janmasthan Seva Sangh which signed the compromise agreement and his legal authority to sign agreement is contested. He was succeeded by M. A. Ayyangar, followed by Akhandananda Saraswati and Ramdev Maharaj. Nrityagopaldas is the present chairman. Following the demolition of the Babri Mosque in 1992, Manohar Lal Sharma, a resident of Vrindavan, has filed a petition in the Mathura District Court challenging the 1968 agreement as well as a petition to quash the Places of Religious Worship Act of 1991 which preserves the status quo as on 15 August 1947 for all places of worship.

{
  "type": "FeatureCollection",
  "features": [
    {
      "type": "Feature",
      "properties": {
        "title": "Keshavadeva temple"
      },
      "geometry": {
        "type": "Polygon",
        "coordinates": [
          [
            [
              77.669592440216,
              27.504506233468
            ],
            [
              77.669592440216,
              27.504953494154
            ],
            [
              77.669978678314,
              27.504953494154
            ],
            [
              77.669978678314,
              27.504506233468
            ],
            [
              77.669592440216,
              27.504506233468
            ]
          ]
        ]
      }
    },
    {
      "type": "Feature",
      "properties": {
        "title": "Shahi Eidgah"
      },
      "geometry": {
        "type": "Polygon",
        "coordinates": [
          [
            [
              77.669753372757,
              27.505096236544
            ],
            [
              77.669753372757,
              27.50549591425
            ],
            [
              77.669903576461,
              27.50549591425
            ],
            [
              77.669903576461,
              27.505096236544
            ],
            [
              77.669753372757,
              27.505096236544
            ]
          ]
        ]
      }
    },
    {
      "type": "Feature",
      "properties": {
        "title": "Garbha Griha temple (prison cell)"
      },
      "geometry": {
        "type": "Polygon",
        "coordinates": [
          [
            [
              77.669356405822,
              27.505153333448
            ],
            [
              77.669356405822,
              27.505343656247
            ],
            [
              77.669613897888,
              27.505343656247
            ],
            [
              77.669613897888,
              27.505153333448
            ],
            [
              77.669356405822,
              27.505153333448
            ]
          ]
        ]
      }
    },
    {
      "type": "Feature",
      "properties": {
        "title": "Potra Kund"
      },
      "geometry": {
        "type": "Polygon",
        "coordinates": [
          [
            [
              77.667242825119,
              27.50422233306
            ],
            [
              77.667242825119,
              27.50422233306
            ],
            [
              77.667832911102,
              27.504488787141
            ],
            [
              77.667832911102,
              27.504488787141
            ],
            [
              77.668122589675,
              27.503946362081
            ],
            [
              77.668122589675,
              27.503946362081
            ],
            [
              77.667543232528,
              27.503641841577
            ],
            [
              77.667543232528,
              27.503641841577
            ],
            [
              77.667242825119,
              27.50422233306
            ]
          ]
        ]
      }
    },
    {
      "type": "Feature",
      "properties": {
        "marker-symbol": "water",

        "marker-size": "small",
        "title": "Potra Kund"},
      "geometry": {
        "type": "Point",
        "coordinates": [
          77.667682707397,
          27.504011389739
        ]
      }
    },
    {
      "type": "Feature",
      "properties": {

        "marker-symbol": "place-of-worship",

        "marker-size": "small",
        "title": "Keshavdeva Temple"},
      "geometry": {
        "type": "Point",
        "coordinates": [
          77.669764101593,
          27.504706073574
        ]
      }
    },
    {
      "type": "Feature",
      "properties": {

        "marker-symbol": "place-of-worship",

        "marker-size": "small",
        "title": "Garbha Griha shrine"},
      "geometry": {
        "type": "Point",
        "coordinates": [
          77.669474423019,
          27.505248494889
        ]
      }
    },
    {
      "type": "Feature",
      "properties": {

        "marker-symbol": "religious-muslim",

        "marker-size": "small",
        "title": "Eidgah"},
      "geometry": {
        "type": "Point",
        "coordinates": [
          77.66982847460896,
          27.505238978748423
        ]
      }
    }
  ]
}

Temples and monuments

The temple complex contains Keshavdeva temple, Garbha Griha shrine and Bhagavata Bhavan.

Keshavdeva Temple
The Keshavdeva Temple was built by Ramkrishna Dalmia in memory of his mother Jadiadevi Dalmia. The construction of the temple started on 29 June 1957 and inaugurated on 6 September 1958 by Hanuman Prasad Poddar. It is located south of the Shahi Eidgah.

Garbha Griha shrine
It is said that Shahi Eidgah was constructed on the sabhamandapa (assembly hall) of the original temple and the garbha griha (sanctum sactorum) was left. It is considered as the place of the prison cell where Krishna is believed to have born. A marble pavilion and an underground prison cell were built on the place with spacious veranda. There is shrine near it dedicated to eight-handed goddess Yogmaya. It is located against the rear wall of the Shahi Eidgah.

Bhagavata Bhavan
The construction of the temple dedicated to Shrimad Bhagavata was started on 11 February 1965 and the installation ceremony of the deities were held on 12 February 1982. It includes five shrines: the main shrine having six-feet tall couple of Radha and Krishna; the shrine of Balarama, Subhadra and Jagannatha on right; the temple of Rama, Lakshmana and Sita on left; Garuda Stambha (pillar) and Chaitanya Mahaprabhu in front of Jagannatha shrine and Hanuman in front of Ram shrine; the temple of Durga and the temple with Shivalinga. The ceiling, walls and pillars of the assembly hall are adorned with frescoes depicting life events of Krishna and his associates and devotees. The text of Bhagavad Gita engraved on copper-plates adorn the walls of the parikrama (circumambulation) of the main temple. There are statues of Malaviya and Birla in the complex.

Other constructions include the Ayurveda Bhavan, International Guest House, shops, library and open space for performances.

Potra Kund 
There is a large and deep stepped water tank, Potra Kund or Pavitra Kund, in south-east of the Janmasthan temple which is said to have been used for the first bath of child Krishna after his birth. The steps of the tank were built by Mahadji Scindia in 1782. They were restored by his descendants in 1850.

Culture 

The temple is one of the most visited temple of India. Krishna Janmashtami, Radhashtami, Diwali and Holi are the major festivals celebrated at this temple and entire Braj region.

See also 
Nandmahar Dham

References

External links

 Official website
 Temple Information on Mathura Online

Tourist attractions in Mathura
Hindu temples in Mathura district
Krishna temples
1958 establishments in Uttar Pradesh